Darryn Randall (2 December 1980 – 27 October 2013) was a South African cricketer. He was a right-handed batsman and wicket-keeper who played for Border during the 2009–10 season, making four first-class and four List-A appearances. He was born in East London. Randall made his first-class debut against Northerns on 8 October 2009.

Death
Randall died on 27 October 2013 at the age of 32 after being hit on the head by a cricket ball during a match in Alice, Eastern Cape. He died immediately when the ball impacted his head while attempting a pull shot.

See also 

 List of unusual deaths
 Ray Chapman, an American baseball player killed after being struck by a ball during a game; he was the only player in Major League Baseball history to die of an in-game injury

 List of fatal accidents in cricket

References

External links
Darryn Randall at Cricket Archive

1980 births
2013 deaths
Border cricketers
Sport deaths in South Africa
South African cricketers
Wicket-keepers
Cricket deaths
Deaths from head injury